KATI (94.3 FM), branded as 94.3 KAT Country, is a radio station which broadcasts country music and St. Louis Cardinals baseball. Licensed to California, Missouri, the station serves the Jefferson City area and is owned by the Zimmer Radio Group of Mid-Missouri.

External links

ATI
Radio stations established in 1982
1982 establishments in Missouri